The Battle of Soissons was fought in 486 between Frankish forces under Clovis I and the Gallo-Roman domain of Soissons under Syagrius. The battle was a victory for the Franks, and led to the conquest of the Roman rump state of Soissons, a milestone for the Franks in their attempt to establish themselves as a major regional power.

In the final collapse of the Western Roman Empire between 476 and 480, Syagrius was the only remaining representative of Roman rule in the area between the Loire and the Somme. Syagrius was the son of Aegidius, Roman magister militum per Gallias from 457 to 461; he preserved his father's rump state, the Domain of Soissons, between the Somme and the Loire, calling himself dux.

The central location of Soissons in northern Gaul and its largely intact infrastructure allowed a level of stability in the years of the Migration Period, but also made the area tempting for their Frankish neighbours to the north-east. The realm of Syagrius was of almost the same size as the Frankish area, though the Franks were divided into small kingdoms, and, on the right bank of the Rhine, little touched by Roman culture.

Nevertheless, Clovis I managed to assemble enough Franks to confront Syagrius's forces. Clovis issued a challenge to Syagrius naming the time and place of the battle. Gregory of Tours mentions that one Chararic had brought his forces to the battlefield but then stood aloof, hoping to ally with the winner.

The ensuing battle was a decisive victory for Clovis and his Franks. Syagrius fled to the Visigoths (under Alaric II), but Clovis threatened war and the Visigoths handed Syagrius over for execution.

Consequently, the realm of the Franks almost doubled in size; its border was now on the Loire adjacent to the realm of the Visigoths, who were finally routed at the Battle of Vouillé in 507 and forced to retreat south of the Pyrenées.

In due course Clovis marched against Chararic, captured him and his sons, and forced them to accept ordination and tonsures as deacons. On report of their hope to regain power, he had them executed.

See also
Vase of Soissons

References

486
Soissons 486
Soissons 486
Soissons 486
Soissons 486
Soissons
480s in the Roman Empire
5th century in sub-Roman Gaul
Kingdom of Soissons